The Ch. Ranbir Singh State Institute of Engineering & Technology, Jhajjar (Hindi : चौधरी रणबीर सिंह राजकीय अभियांत्रिकी एवं प्रौद्योगिकी संस्थान, झज्जर, abbreviated CRSSIET) is a public government engineering institution in Jhajjar. It is one of the four engineering colleges run by the Government of Haryana, the others being Ch. Devi Lal State Institute of Engineering & Technology, Sirsa, Rao Bijender Singh State Institute of Engineering & Technology, Rewari, and State Institute of Engineering & Technology, Nilokheri.

History
Ch. Ranbir Singh State Institute of Engineering & Technology, Jhajjar is a State Government Engineering College in Haryana. The college was Established in 2017, This college is named after the former Ranbir Singh Hooda, was an Indian Independence activist and a Politician from Haryana. He Belonged to Haryana and was a Minister in The Individual Punjab and Haryana.

Recognition
Ch. Ranbir Singh State Institute of Engineering and Technology, Jhajjar affiliated to Maharishi Dayanand University is approved by All India Council of Technical Education, New Delhi and the Department of Technical Education, Govt. of Haryana.

Admission
Admission in B.Tech. first year is given to students on the basis of their ranks in Joint Entrance Examination-Main. Admission in second year though B.Tech. Lateral Entry scheme is done on basis of B.E./B.Tech. Lateral Engineering Entrance Test exam conducted by Haryana State Technical Education Society.

Academic programs 
Ch. Ranbir Singh State Institute of Engineering & Technology, Jhajjar awards undergraduate B.Tech in various engineering fields in a four-year engineering programme.

Campus
The institute is in Jhajjar, district Jhajjar, Haryana. It is well connected by road and railway having Jhajjar railway station. The campus is also close to other educational, training and research institutions such as the Govt. Polytechnic Jhajjar, University Institute of Engineering and Technology, and Maharishi Dayanand University. The institute is in close proximity to various industrial townships.

Associated institutions
 All India Council for Technical Education
 List of institutions of higher education in Haryana
 National Assessment and Accreditation Council

References

http://crssietjhajjar.ac.in/
http://crssietjhajjar.ac.in/wp-content/uploads/2019/07/Final-B.Tech-Prospectus-2018-19.pdf
https://crssiet.weebly.com/
https://www.tutorialsinc.tech/

External links
http://techadmissionshry.gov.in/
http://hstes.org.in/
https://web.archive.org/web/20171116150415/http://techeduhry.nic.in/
http://www.mdurohtak.ac.in/
http://www.aicte-india.org/
https://www.softstimulatorsinc.com/

Engineering colleges in Haryana
Universities and colleges in Haryana
All India Council for Technical Education